The Price of Fear is a horror/mystery radio serial produced by BBC Radio between 1973 and 1983. The host and star of the show was Vincent Price.

This show stands out in Price's radio career as some of the episodes are based on fictional adventures of Vincent Price himself, in which Price plays himself, while others have him merely introducing the macabre tale of the week. Twenty-two episodes were produced. Writing credits for the series include William Ingram, Stanley Ellin, Richard Davis, R. Chetwynd-Hayes, A. M. Burrage, Elizabeth Morgan, Rene Basilico, Roald Dahl and Price himself.  Fifteen of the episodes were rebroadcast by BBC Radio 7 in the spring of 2010. They have periodically been repeated on BBC Radio 4 Extra ever since.

Episodes
 Remains to be Seen by William Ingram (based on the story by Jack Ritchie)
 William and Mary by Barry Campbell (based on the story by Roald Dahl)
 Cat's Cradle by Richard Davis (based on "The Squaw'" by Bram Stoker)
 Meeting in Athens by Maurice Travers (based on "So Cold, So Pale, So Fair" by Charles Birkin)
 The Man Who Hated Scenes by William Ingram based on the story by Robert Arthur)
 Lot 132 by Elizabeth Morgan 
 The Waxwork by Barry Campbell (based on the story by A. M. Burrage)
 Fish by Rene Basilico 
 Soul Music by William Ingram
 Guy Fawkes' Night by Richard Davies
 Come As You Are by William Ingram
 Speciality of the House (based on the story by Stanley Ellin)
 The Ninth Removal (based on the story by R. Chetwynd-Hayes)
 An Eye for An Eye by William Ingram
 Blind Man’s Bluff by William Ingram
 Never Gamble With A Loser (probably not recorded) 
 Goody Two Shoes by William Ingram
 To My Dear, Dear Saladin by William Ingram
 The Family Album by William Ingram
 Not Wanted on Voyage by William Ingram
 Out of the Mouths by William Ingram
 Is There Anybody There? by William Ingram

References

External links
 
 The Definitive The Price of Fear Radio Log with Vincent Price
 The Price of Fear on My Old Radio
  The Price of Fear at RadioLovers.com
 The Price of Fear at The Sound of Vincent Price

British radio dramas
BBC Radio 4 Extra programmes